Third Strike may refer to:

 A strikeout in baseball
 3rd Strike (band), a rap rock group
 Third Strike (album), a 2010 album by Tinchy Stryder
 Street Fighter III: 3rd Strike video game

See also
 Three strikes law in US legal system
 Three strikes (disambiguation)